Berit Reiss-Andersen (born 11 July 1954) is a Norwegian lawyer, author and former politician for the Norwegian Labour Party. She is chairman of the Norwegian Nobel Committee, the 5-member committee that awards the Nobel Peace Prize. She is also a board member of the Nobel Foundation, which has the overall responsibility for all the five Nobel Prizes. She served as state secretary for the Minister of Justice and Police from 1996 to 1997 and as president of the Norwegian Bar Association from 2008 to 2012. She has co-authored two crime novels with former Minister of Justice Anne Holt. She is currently a partner at DLA Piper's Oslo office.

Legal career

Reiss Andersen earned her Candidate of Jurisprudence degree (a 6-year law degree) in 1981 at the University of Oslo, Norway's preeminent university. She was an executive officer at the Norwegian Office of Immigration 1981–1982 and legal adviser at the Royal Ministry of Justice and the Police 1982–1984. She served as a prosecutor with the Oslo Police District 1984–1987. From 1987 to 2016 she had her own law practice in Oslo, and she obtained the right to appear before the Supreme Court of Norway in 1995. In 1997 she was appointed as one of the regular defence counsels at Oslo District Court and Borgarting Court of Appeal. In 2016 she became a partner at DLA Piper's Oslo office. She was president of the Norwegian Bar Association from 2008 to 2012.

Political career
She served as state secretary for the Minister of Justice and Police from 1996 to 1997, in the Labour Party government of Thorbjørn Jagland.

Nobel Prize roles

She was elected as a Member of the Norwegian Nobel Committee by the Storting (Parliament) on 22 November 2011, and was nominated by the Norwegian Labour Party. Her term started 1 January 2012 and ends 31 December 2017. On 20 February 2017 she became the acting chairman of the committee, following the death of Kaci Kullmann Five. On 2 May 2017, she was formally elected as the chairman of the Norwegian Nobel Committee. In this capacity Reiss-Andersen selects the Nobel Peace Prize laureate together with the four other committee members, and she is responsible for formally presenting the prize.

From 2014 she is also a board member of the Nobel Foundation, which has the overall responsibility for all the five Nobel Prizes.

Reiss-Andersen has criticized Erna Solberg over her silence on Nobel Peace Prize laureate Liu Xiaobo when he was dying in prison in China and the Norwegian government refused to say whether it supported the European Union's demand that Liu be released; Reiss-Andersen described Solberg and her right-wing government's attitude as "embarrassing." On behalf of the Norwegian Nobel Committee and the Nobel Foundation, Reiss-Andersen wanted to participate in Liu Xiaobo's funeral, but was denied a visa by the Chinese government.

Literary work
She has co-authored two crime novels with former Minister of Justice Anne Holt.

Background
Her paternal grandfather was Gunnar Reiss-Andersen, who wrote lyric poetry.

Bibliography 
 1997 Løvens gap (co-authored with Anne Holt)
 2000 Uten ekko (co-authored with Anne Holt)

References

1954 births
Living people
20th-century Norwegian lawyers
Norwegian crime fiction writers
Norwegian state secretaries
Norwegian women lawyers
Chairpersons of the Norwegian Nobel Committee
21st-century Norwegian lawyers